Graham Reed may refer to:

 Graham Reed (footballer, born 1961), English football forward
 Graham Reed (footballer, born 1938), English football wing half
 Graham Reed (psychologist) (1923–1989), Canadian psychologist

See also
 Graham Reid (disambiguation)